Kholo is a rural locality in the City of Brisbane, Queensland, Australia.

Geography

History
On Friday 23 June 1876, the Kholo Bridge across the Brisbane River to Chuwar was officially opened. Determined to have a first official crossing of the bridge, a group of men pulled a buggy containing a "courageous lady" across the submerged bridge and Mrs Foote smashed a bottle against a bridge post and named the bridge. A banquet followed the ceremony.

Kholo Provisional School opened circa 1 January 1877. It was described in June 1877 as being in a barn in an inconvenient location. In June 1878, the local residents were advocating for a more permanent state school. In September 1883, a report describes the school as having "most irregular" attendance. In July 1884, Kholo was again mentioned as having an average attendance of 16 students out of 30 enrolled. It closed circa 1 December 1884. In July 1886, local residents asked for a state school to replace the former provisional school, but no further schools were built in the area.

In May 1881 tenders were called for the erection of a provisional school in Lower Kholo (now Mount Crosby), which seems to result in Kholo Provisional School being casually referred to as Upper Kholo Provisional School.

Kholo, Mount Crosby and Karana Downs were transferred from the City of Ipswich to become part of City of Brisbane in 2000.

The median age of the Kholo population was 42 years of age, 5 years above the Australian median. 84.8% of people living in Kholo were born in Australia, compared to the national average of 69.8%; the next most common countries of birth were England 5.1%, New Zealand 1.8%, Samoa 1.3%, Scotland 1%, Finland 0.8%. 96% of people spoke only English at home; the next most common languages were 1.5% Samoan, 1% Vietnamese.

Amenities
There is a park at 384-186B Lake Manchester Road.

References

External links
 
 
 

Suburbs of the City of Brisbane
Localities in Queensland